Nacional, the Portuguese and Spanish word for "national", may refer to:

Airlines
 Nacional Transportes Aéreos, a Brazilian airline defunct in 2002 
 Transportes Aéreos Nacional, a Brazilian airline defunct in 1961

Bank
 Banco Nacional, a former Brazilian bank

Music
 Discos Nacional (Nacional-Glücksmann, later Nacional-Odeon), an Argentine record label run by Max Glücksmann
 Nacional Records, a record label

Print media
 Nacional (newspaper), a defunct Serbian daily newspaper published 2001–2003
 Nacional (weekly), a Croatian weekly magazine

Sports
 Clube Desportivo Nacional popularly known as "Nacional da Madeira", a football club from Madeira, Portugal
 Club Nacional de Football, from Montevideo, Uruguay
 Atlético Nacional, the football club from Medellín, Colombia
 Club Deportivo El Nacional, a football club from Quito, the capital of Ecuador
 Club Nacional, a Paraguayan football club
 Nacional de Guadalajara, a football club from Guadalajara, Mexico
 Nacional Fast Clube, a Brazilian football club
 Nacional Futebol Clube, a Brazilian football club
 Nacional Futebol Clube (MG), a Brazilian football club from Uberaba, Minas Gerais
 Nacional Atlético Clube (MG), a Brazilian football club
 Nacional Atlético Clube (SP), a Brazilian football club
 Nacional Atlético Clube Sociedade Civil Ltda., a Brazilian football club
 Nacional Atlético Clube (Cabedelo), a Brazilian football club
 Nacional Atlético Clube (Patos), a Brazilian football club
 Nacional Esporte Clube (MG), a Brazilian football club from Nova Serrana
 Esporte Clube Nacional, a Brazilian football club
 Sociedade Esportiva Nacional, a Brazilian football club
 S.D. Atlético Nacional, a Panamanian second-tier football club
 F.C. Nacional, a Croatian futsal club
 FCS Nacional, a Surinamese football club
 Nacional championship, one of the tournaments in Primera División Argentina from 1967 to 1985

Other uses
 Nacional (cocoa bean)

See also
 National (disambiguation)
 Nacional Atlético Clube (disambiguation)
 El Nacional (disambiguation)